The Serpent Warriors (also known as The Golden Viper) is a 1987 American-Hong Kong crime-horror film directed by John Howard and Niels Rasmussen starring Clint Walker, Eartha Kitt, Christopher Mitchum, Anne Lockhart, Kathleen Lu, Yuen Kao, and Anita Merritt.

Plot
A zoologist is called to a construction site that has snakes that was once was the ancient site of a snake-worshiping cult.

Cast
 Clint Walker as Morgan Bates
 Eartha Kitt as Snake Priestess
 Christopher Mitchum as Dr. Tim Muffett
 Anne Lockhart as Laura Chase
 Kathleen Lu as Mrs. King
 Yuen Kao as Jason King
 Anita Merritt as Serpent Princess

Production

Filming locations
The Serpent Warriors was filmed in Nevada and Taiwan.

Reception

Critical response
Paul Freitag-Fey of the Daily Grindhouse wrote in his review: "In other words, Serpent Warriors is exactly the mess of a movie that you’d expect from a film created by three different sources each with their own plot and characters." He could not figure out how Eartha Kitt was cast in the film as "it’s a bit puzzling that her film career was so… varied."

References

Citations

Sources

External links
 
 The Serpent Warriors at Daily Grindhouse.

1985 films
English-language Hong Kong films
Films about snakes
Crime horror films
Hong Kong crime films
1980s English-language films
American crime films
Hong Kong horror films
American horror films
1980s American films
1980s Hong Kong films